The Asian Men's Club Volleyball Championship, previously the AVC Cup Men's Club Tournament (between 1999–2002), is an annual continental club volleyball competition organised by the Asian Volleyball Confederation (AVC), the sport's continental governing body. The competition was first contested in 1999 in China. It was not held in 2003 and 2020 due to 2002–2004 SARS outbreak and COVID-19 pandemic respectively.

The winner of the Asian Men's Club Volleyball Championship qualifies for the FIVB Volleyball Men's Club World Championship.

Paykan Tehran hold the record for most victories, winning the competition eight times. Teams from Iran have won the tournament 16 times, the most for any nation. The current Asian champions are Iran's Paykan Tehran, who defeated Japan's Suntory Sunbirds 3–2 in the final of the 2022 event.

History

The competition began in 1999, when the Asian Volleyball Confederation announced the establishment of the first official championship for men's and women's clubs, to be played under its supervision for the first time. Its played the first 4 editions under the name AVC Cup Men's Club Tournament before it changed to its current name starting in 2004.

The first edition was played as a round-robin format. From 2000 to 2004, the tournament consisted of an 'elimination round' (consisting of a group stage, through which the top four teams advanced to the next round) and a 'final round' (consisting of a semi-final and a final). In the 2005 season, the round-robin format was returned. In the years 2006-2009, the tournament again consisted of two rounds: qualifying and final. Currently, the competition is played in a similar system as in the years 2006-2009, but the final tournament currently consists of a quarter-final, semi-final and final.

Format
The overview of the competition format in the 2021 tournament was as follows:
16 teams competed in the final tournament, including the hosts which were automatically qualified.
Teams were seeded by the result of 2019 Asian Men's Club Volleyball Championship, based on a serpentine system.
The tournament was held in 8 days.
A team had a maximum 22 team members: 14 players, 6 officials, 1 accompanying referee, and 1 press with FIVB ID.
Two foreign players would be eligible for participating on each team with a valid International Transfer Certificate.
In addition, the hosting national federation might have an additional team entry only in case of less than 8 participating teams.

Championship, based on a serpentine sysng on each team with a valid International Transfer Certificate.
In addition, the hosting national federation might have an additional team entry only in case of less than 8 participating teams.

Championships

Performances by club

Performances by country

Performances by zonal association

Medals
As of 2022 Asian Men's Club Volleyball Championship.

See also

Asian Women's Club Volleyball Championship

References

External links
 Website Official
 Asian Volleyball Confederation at Facebook
 Asian Volleyball Confederation at Twitter
 Asian Volleyball Confederation at Instagram

 

 
Club Men
Recurring sporting events established in 1999
April sporting events
May sporting events